Au chic resto pop is a Canadian documentary film, directed by Tahani Rached and released in 1990. The film centres on poverty in the Montreal borough of Hochelaga-Maisonneuve, in part through a portrait of a community soup kitchen.

The film received a Genie Award nomination for Best Feature Length Documentary at the 12th Genie Awards in 1991.

References

External links
 

1990 films
1990 documentary films
Canadian documentary films
Documentary films about poverty in Canada
National Film Board of Canada documentaries
Quebec films
French-language Canadian films
Films directed by Tahani Rached
1990s Canadian films